Swansea is a ghost town in La Paz County in the U.S. state of Arizona. It was settled circa 1909 in what was then the Arizona Territory. It served as a mining town as well as a location for processing and smelting the copper ore taken from the nearby mines.

History
Prospecting and mining in the area first began circa 1862, but the remote location and lack of transportation kept activity to a minimum. By 1904, the railroad was coming to nearby Parker, and local miners Newton Evans and Thomas Jefferson Carrigan saw an opportunity to develop the area. Within a few years, the two miners had built a 350-ton furnace, a water pipeline to the Bill Williams River, and hoists for five mine shafts. They called the new town Signal (not to be confused with the other Arizona ghost town of Signal). By 1908, the claims in the area had been consolidated by the Clara Gold and Copper Mining Company, which set up its headquarters in the mining camp that would become Swansea. These two factors spurred the growth of the town, and its population quickly grew to approximately 300 residents.

When mining operations first began, the lack of smelting facilities meant that the copper ore had to be sent away for smelting. The destination for most of the ore was Swansea, South Wales, United Kingdom and it was sent by way of railroad to the Colorado River, and was then shipped from the Gulf of California around Cape Horn to the United Kingdom. Once a smelter was constructed in 1909, Signal took its new name from the previous location of the smelter they had used in Wales. As such, the destination of the ore sent for smelting remained the same. When the post office was established on March 25, 1909, it was under the name of Swansea.

At its peak, Swansea boasted an electric light company, an auto dealer, a lumber company, two cemeteries, a saloon, theaters, restaurants, barbershops, an insurance agent, a physician, and of course the local mining and smelting facilities.

Decline
The town was short-lived. By 1911, the Clara Consolidated Gold and Copper Mining Company was in financial trouble. The company's promoter in Swansea, George Mitchell, spent considerable sums of money on improvements aimed at attracting investors at the expense of practical improvements to the process of mining, hauling, and processing ore. As a result, the high cost of improvements coupled with the high cost of production meant that the mines could not turn a profit as the per-pound cost of copper production exceeded its price by three cents. The company collapsed in 1912, closing down the mines.

After a false start later that year under a new owner, the mines and the town remained quiet until the American Smelting and Refining Company bought the properties in 1914. The new owners restarted mining operations and once again built up the town. Swansea lived on until just after World War I when copper prices dropped, and the town went into a steep decline. Swansea's post office was discontinued on June 28, 1924, and the population dispersed. By 1937, the mines shut down, and Swansea was already a ghost town.

Remnants
Today Swansea is under the protection of the Bureau of Land Management, and constitutes the Swansea Town Site Special Management Area. Due to vandalism and exposure to the weather, the remains of Swansea are in decline. However, you can still see a number of adobe structures, the remains of the railroad depot, two cemeteries, and several mine shafts. Remains of numerous cars can be seen scattered throughout the site. The Bureau of Land Management has restored roofs to rows of single-miner's quarters, established an interpretive trail for visitors to Swansea, and is engaged in efforts to shore up other structures. In addition, there are many stone foundations where buildings once stood.

Geography

The site is remote, and is only accessible via rough, gravel roads.

Demographics
US Census data placed the population of the town at 400 in 1910 shortly after it was founded, and 337 in 1920, shortly before it was abandoned. By some accounts, the town's population peaked at about 750 residents, though the rapid rise and fall of the town coupled with the timing of the collection of population data make that figure difficult to substantiate.

Popular culture
 In the Chris Ryan novel, Blackout, Swansea is the location of Luke's hideout.
 The training scenes in the 1971 film The Day of the Wolves were shot in Swansea.
 Folk singer Joanna Newsom included a song on her 2004 The Milk-Eyed Mender titled

See also
 American frontier
 Boomtown
 Copper mining in Arizona
 History of Arizona
 List of ghost towns in Arizona

References

External links

 Swansea Historic Townsite – Bureau of Land Management
 Swansea at Ghosttowns.com
 Swansea at Ghost Town Gallery
 Swansea – Ghost Town of the Month at azghosttowns.com

Populated places in La Paz County, Arizona
Ghost towns in Arizona
Protected areas of La Paz County, Arizona
Bureau of Land Management areas in Arizona
Cemeteries in Arizona
Populated places established in 1908
1908 establishments in Arizona Territory